Podgórze Duchackie is one of 18 districts of Kraków, located in the southern part of the city. The name Podgórze Duchackie comes from two villages that are now parts of the district.

Subdivisions of Podgórze Duchackie
Podgórze Duchackie is divided into smaller subdivisions (osiedles). Here's a list of them.
 Kurdwanów
 Kurdwanów Nowy
 Osiedle Piaski Nowe
 Osiedle Podlesie
 Piaski Wielkie
 Wola Duchacka
 Wola Duchacka Wschód
 Wola Duchacka Zachód

Population

References

External links
 Official website of Podgórze Duchackie
 Biuletyn Informacji Publicznej

Districts of Kraków